Adelaide International may refer to:

 Adelaide International (art exhibition), a series of art exhibitions held at the Samstag Museum
 Adelaide International (tennis), a professional tennis tournament beginning in January 2020
 Adelaide International Raceway, a permanent motor racing circuit at Virginia, South Australia
 Australian International Three Day Event, also known as the Adelaide International Horse Trials, an annual event taking place in the eastern parklands of Adelaide